The West Baltimore Innovation Village District is a neighborhood district of Baltimore City that will specialize in attracting startup companies and other employers to West Baltimore. Following the Death of Freddie Gray and the subsequent 2015 Baltimore protests, government leaders decided to launch the innovation district as a way to attract redevelopment and revitalization to the areas hardest hit by the protests. The district includes the neighborhoods of Mondawmin, Coppin Heights, Penn-North, Reservoir Hill and Bolton Hill.

Background
Efforts to form the district originated from the community organization known as the Mount Royal Community Development Corporation (MRCDC). Similar innovation districts have been formed in neighborhoods like University City in Philadelphia and the South Boston Seaport District. The West Baltimore Innovation District neighbors the nearby Station North Arts and Entertainment District and includes access to numerous forms of transportation including the Baltimore Metro Subway and Baltimore Light Rail.

Neighborhood attractions
 Coppin State University
 Druid Hill Park
 Howard Peters Rawlings Conservatory and Botanic Gardens of Baltimore
 The Maryland Zoo in Baltimore
 Mondawmin Mall
 Maryland Institute College of Art

Transportation
 Mondawmin Metro Station
 Penn–North Metro Station
 Upton / Avenue Market Metro Station
 State Center Metro Station
 Cultural Center Light Rail stop
 University of Baltimore — Mt. Royal Light Rail stop
 North Avenue Light Rail stop

References

West Baltimore
Neighborhoods in Baltimore
Economy of Baltimore
Maryland Institute College of Art
High-technology business districts in the United States